Qaleh-ye Ali (also Romanized as Qal‘eh-ye ‘Alī and Qal‘eh ‘Alī; also known as Qal‘eh-ye Ḩājjī ‘Alī) is a village in Zagheh Rural District, Zagheh District, Khorramabad County, Lorestan Province, Iran. At the 2006 census, its population was 327, in 73 families.

References 

Towns and villages in Khorramabad County